The Maple Street Historic District consists of a cluster of ten similar worker cottages on Maple Street in Southbridge, Massachusetts.  They were built as part of an effort by the locally important American Optical Company to improve the quality of its worker housing in the 1910s.  The district was listed on the National Register of Historic Places in 1989.

Description and history
The American Optical Company was a major employer in Southbridge from the late 19th century well into the 20th century.  Its owners, members of the Wells family, had a history of building housing units (which they retained personal ownership of) to rent to workers in their factories.  At some point in the early 20th century the company began acquiring existing houses which it also used to provide worker housing.  Around 1915 the company built a series of housing units.  The Maple Street cluster is one of these; others that have survived relatively intact include Windsor Court and Twinehurst Place, both of which consist of multiunit buildings.

The Maple Street properties are ten nearly identical wood-framed gambrel-roofed Colonial Revival (Dutch Colonial) cottages, which the company intended as housing for its foremen.  All are oriented with a gable end to the street, with the main entrances of the houses on the sides, facing each other in pairs.  Nominally  stories tall, they feature long dormers in their roof line that create a full second story inside.  All feature a slate roof, stucco exterior, and an enclosed porch.  The design work for them was done by Loring & Leland of Boston, who are known to have designed other worker housing areas.

See also
National Register of Historic Places listings in Southbridge, Massachusetts
National Register of Historic Places listings in Worcester County, Massachusetts

References

Colonial Revival architecture in Massachusetts
Historic districts in Worcester County, Massachusetts
National Register of Historic Places in Southbridge, Massachusetts
Historic districts on the National Register of Historic Places in Massachusetts